Waltons was an Australian department store chain, founded by John Walton (1904–1998).

History

Walton bought a menswear store in 1951, located on George Street, Sydney, opposite the Queen Victoria Building and Sydney Town Hall and near Town Hall station. Over the years it was expanded along Park Street with adjoining properties purchased.

In 1955, Walton formed an alliance with the American retail giant Sears, Roebuck and Co. In the early 1960s, he started a finance company in partnership with Citibank, and also moved into insurance. That part of the business was sold to Norwich Union in 1980.

There were changes in the retail scene in Australia in the 1960s and Waltons Limited bought out Marcus Clark & Co in 1966, and then Anthony Hordern & Sons, merging its country store operation into the Walton's store group. That excluded the Brickfield Hill store in the south of the Sydney central business district, which by 1969 had already closed. Waltons then acquired McDowells in 1972. By 1972, the Waltons chain had expanded to 96 department stores before Walton retired as executive chairman. Sir John severed his ties with the company in 1976, and his son John took over.

Alan Bond bought Waltons in 1981, but the purchase became a financial disaster, with Bond losing $199 million in 1983. The Waltons department store name was dropped by new owners in the form of a $75 million clearance sale when Bond sold Waltons in 1987 (and closed its employee superannuation fund), to interests associated with the Cooke family. The Cooke family re-branded the remaining stores as Venture and Norman Ross outlets. In 1994, Venture went bankrupt.

The flagship Waltons department store on George Street, Sydney, was demolished, and employees and the media were informed that Bond Corporation intended to build Australia's tallest building, including a brand new Waltons store, on the same site. Due to the above-mentioned losses, that didn't happen. The piece of prime real estate remained nothing more than a huge hole in the ground for years.  It was finally replaced by the Citibank office tower, which includes the Galeries Victoria retail space. The main Melbourne store, on Bourke Street, was remodelled into a Village Cinemas complex, which closed in 2006.

The Waltons store in Fortitude Valley, Brisbane, still has a Brunswick Street Mall store-front with "Waltons" signage, but with blacked-out door glass since the store closed around 1987. The street entrances or exits to the bottom level, which are occupied by Asian novelty product stores, still have the word "Walton" screwed into the wall, with the S possibly having been removed as a souvenir.

Store locations

Australian Capital Territory

See also

Department stores around the world

References

Companies based in Sydney
Defunct department stores of Australia
Sears Holdings
Retail companies established in 1951
Australian companies established in 1951
Australian companies disestablished in 1987
Retail companies disestablished in 1987